Alajõe Parish was a rural municipality of Ida-Viru County in northern Estonia.

Villages
Alajõe - Karjamaa - Katase - Remniku - Smolnitsa - Uusküla - Vasknarva

References 

 
Former municipalities of Estonia